The Blastolene Indy Special is a unique, specially built car. Created from a military tank engine and a custom-made aluminium body, it produces 810 bhp at 2,800 rpm and 1,560 ft-lb of torque at 2,400 rpm. The successor to the Blastolene Special, the design of the Blastolene Indy Special is styled after a 1950s era Indy Car.

The car sold at auction on January 23, 2010.

See also
 Rolls-Royce Merlin alternative uses

References

External links
Blastolene Indy Special official site.

One-off cars

Individual cars